Pronya may refer to several rivers:

Pronya, a tributary of the Oka in Russia
Pronia, a tributary of the Sozh in Belarus